Westfield UTC (formerly known as University Towne Centre) is an open-air shopping mall located in the University City community of San Diego, California built in 1977. It lies just east of La Jolla, near the University of California, San Diego campus. It is owned – except for the ex-Sears parcel – by the Unibail-Rodamco-Westfield. Its anchors include Macy's, Nordstrom and a 14-screen AMC Theatres.

The mall is served by the UTC Transit Center, which is the northern terminus of the Blue Line of the San Diego Trolley.

History
Ernest W. Hahn first proposed  building UTC in 1972. Upon opening in 1977, the anchor stores were Robinson's (later Robinsons-May), The Broadway (now Macy's), and Sears. In 1984, Nordstrom, 31 new stores, and new parking structures opened.

In 1989, UTC was the site of an international incident when a minivan belonging to William C. Rogers III, who had been implicated in the shootdown of Iran Air Flight 655, was bombed there.

In 1998, Westfield bought UTC, except for the parcel owned by Sears. That same year, the Macy's and Robinsons-May locations expanded. J.P. Morgan Investment bought a 50% interest in UTC.

A $12 million remodel in 2007 added grassy areas, trellises with flowering vines, palm trees and fountains, according to UTC in a park-like or "European village" atmosphere, with carts, flowers, fruits and an al fresco food pavilion.”

2010s phased expansion
In 2008, a one-billion-dollar revitalization plan for UTC was approved by the San Diego City Council. However, due to the Late-2000s recession, the revitalization project was put on hold for several years and later reduced to $500 million, but later again revised up to $600 million.

Northwest side
In 2011, the first, $180 million phase of the revitalization commenced: the mall's food court was transformed into an indoor/outdoor Dining Terrace while the former Robinsons-May building was subdivided to house three new retailers: a large-scale Forever 21, a relocated 24 Hour Fitness, a 14-screen AMC Theatres (formerly ArcLight Cinema), plus Tiffany, J.Crew,  and Lululemon stores.

In 2016, construction began on a 400,000-square-foot expansion on the northwest section, including:
 a new 144,000-square-foot Nordstrom, which opened in October 2017, with the old Nordstrom building left abandoned until it was demolished in 2022, also demolishing neighboring retailers which have been empty for many years.
 a new parking garage on the west-central side. The UTC Transit Center trolley station opened at its south end in November 2021, which is the northern terminus of the San Diego Trolley's Blue Line extension. 
 90 new shops, restaurants and services, of which about a third were open by the end of 2017.

Culinary emphasis
Many new restaurants were added during this period including a Shake Shack and a Javier's. Michele Parente, restaurant critic at the San Diego Union-Tribune, called UTC her favorite area for restaurants in San Diego County, noting the presence of Din Tai Fung, Sweetfin Poké, Paranà Empanadas, Napizza, The Winery, Smokehouse BBQ, True Food Kitchen, and La Colombe Coffee Roasters, stating: "eating is what they're selling there now".

Northeast side/former Sears
While construction continued at the northwest of UTC, on the northeast side, Sears closed in July 2017. The Sears parcel is owned by Seritage Growth Properties, a spinoff of Sears. Portions of the space have become Corner Bakery Cafe, Williams Sonoma/Pottery Barn Kids, and Equinox Fitness, with Crate & Barrel on an outparcel.
The Sears building was demolished and the site is now a 2 story building called The Collection. Parts of the project have been opened to the public, while the main building is still under construction.

Other
Palisades at UTC, a 23-story, 300-unit luxury apartment building located at the southeast corner of the site, opened in 2019.

See also
 Fashion Valley Mall
 Westfield Plaza Bonita
 Westfield North County
 Westfield Horton Plaza
 Westfield Century City (UTC's sister mall)

References

External links
Westfield UTC Official Site
Ice Town Ice Skating Rink

Buildings and structures in San Diego
UTC
Shopping malls in San Diego County, California
Shopping malls established in 1977